The 2004 Dhaka grenade attack took place at an anti-terrorism rally organised by Awami League on Bangabandhu Avenue on 21 August 2004. The attack left 24 dead and more than 500 injured. The attack was carried out at 5:22 pm after Sheikh Hasina, the leader of opposition had finished addressing a crowd of 20,000 people from the back of a truck. The attacks targeted Awami League president Sheikh Hasina. Hasina was injured in the attack.The involvement of BNP-Jamaat led government is still debated to this date.

Events and casualties
Awami League chief Sheikh Hasina had been speaking at a public meeting on Bangabandhu Avenue, protesting blasts against the party's workers in Sylhet. The rally drew a crowd of 20,000 people. As Hasina finished her speech, a total of 13 grenades were thrown into the crowd from the rooftops of nearby buildings, killing at least 16 people on spot, later the death toll reached 24. The blast left more than 500 injured. Among the dead were Hasina's bodyguard, Mahbubur Rahman and Awami League Women's Affairs Secretary Ivy Rahman, who died from her injuries three days later.

Reaction 
The Awami League called for a nationwide hartal on 23 and 24 August 2004 following the incident. Khaleda Zia, then Prime Minister of Bangladesh condemned the attacks, and also vowed a thorough probe to catch the culprits. An intercity train was burned down by Awami League activists on strike in Bhairab. Awami Leagues activists also organized protests in Chittagong and furled black flags at the sight of the attack. A funeral service for the victims at Baitul Mokarram National Mosque was attended by 20 thousand people. Protests in Dhaka were attacked by members of Bangladesh Police and Jatiyatabadi Sramik Dal, the workers wing of Bangladesh Nationalist Party. The Jatiyatabadi Sramik Dal activists also attacked and injured six members of the press.

President of the United States, George W. Bush, expressed "shock" at the attack and conveyed his message to Prime Minister Khaleda Zia and Opposition leader Sheikh Hasina through the Secretary of State of the United States, Colin Powell. The attack was also condemned by the United Kingdom, Netherlands, Denmark, France, Germany, Italy, and Sweden.

Investigation

Initial investigation
Bangladesh Police refused to register any criminal case filed by Bangladesh Awami League over the attack and only registered a general diary. The government initially refused to hand over the bodies of the victims. Investigators from the Federal Bureau of Investigation and Interpol made repeated visits to Bangladesh to provide technical support. The Government also tried to implicate Mokhlesur Rahman, an Awami League activists, and Shaibal Saha Partha. They were arrested by Bangladesh Police. Shaibal Saha Partha and Joj Miah were tortured in custody and forced to give a false confessional statement. An investigation by the Supreme Court Bar Association accused the government of destroying evidence. The government was also criticised for hurriedly burying two unidentified dead bodies from the terror attack in the middle of the night.

In 2004, the Bangladesh Nationalist Party-led alliance government assigned the Crime Investigation Department of the police to foresee the investigation. They came up with a story that some Joj Miah, also known as Jamal Ahmed from Noakhali district, along with 14 other criminals of Seven Star terrorist group of Subrata Bain attacked the Awami League rally. They met at Moghbazar before the attack, and rehearsed at a remote island before the attack. The government of Bangladesh formed a one-man judicial probe led by Justice Joynul Abedin. The Awami League rejected the commission which blamed the attack on a neighboring country. The Daily Star described Abedin as a "shame" for the judiciary in Bangladesh.

On 26 June 2005 Joj Mia, a petty criminal, confessed his involvement in the crime under section 164, to the magistrate. The story collapsed following investigative journalism who discovered holes in the official story.

Fresh investigation
In 2007, after the military-backed government assumed office, many of the BNP and Awami League leaders were rounded up by the government agencies, and fresh investigation into the case was launched.

After almost one year, in November 2007, Mufti Hannan, a militant leader from Gopalganj who was arrested by the BNP-led government in 2005, revealed that the attack was operated by the militant outfit Harkat-ul-Jihad-al-Islami of which he was a leader. He also admitted that he got support from Maulana Tazuddin, brother of BNP leader and former deputy minister Abdus Salam Pintu while coordinating the attack.

According to his statement, Abdus Salam Pintu had knowledge of the attack.

In 2008, after the detailed investigation, the then CID high official Mohammad Javed Patwary concluded that the attack was aimed at killing Sheikh Hasina and was guided by the common grievance of both Mufti Hannan and Abdus Salam Pintu against Sheikh Hasina for her role in "subduing" Islam. The investigation report mentioned that, Abdus Salam Pintu was personally responsible for the attack.

Further investigation

In 2009, Awami League came to office and decided to launch a further investigation into the incident and appointed a retired CID official Abdul Kahar Akhand as the person in charge.

In the same year, Abdul Majed Bhat alias Yusuf Bhat gave a confessional statement with the details regarding the source of grenade used in the attack. He claimed that Muzaffar Ahmad Shah of Tehrik-e-Jihad Islami (TEJI) gave the grenades to Maulana Tajuddin to send those to Indian militant groups. Tajuddin, instead of sending those to India, kept those with him. According to Yusuf Bhat, these grenades were later handed over to Mufti Hannan to carry out the attack.

After two years, in 2011, Mufti Hannan gave another confessional statement implicating many big names, mostly BNP leaders and some former officials of the government including the son of opposition leader and former prime minister Khaleda Zia, Tarique Rahman, former deputy minister Abdus Salam Pintu, former member of parliament Kazi Shah Mofazzal Hossain Kaikobad and some officials of the Home Ministry, police, Directorate General of Forces Intelligence (DGFI), National Security Intelligence (NSI) and Prime Minister's Office (PMO) with involvement in the planning of the bombing.

In the statement, Mufti Hannan claimed that the attack was aimed at destroying the top leadership of Awami League including Sheikh Hasina, and BNP leader Tarique Rahman along with Jamaat leader Ali Ahsan Mohammad Mujahid and the then Home Minister Lutfuzzaman Babor assured them with government support.

Perpetrators
Harkat-ul-Jihad-al-Islami (HUJI) leader Mufti Abdul Hannan was arrested on 30 September 2005 for the grenade attacks, and was later charged in connection with it. He reportedly confessed to the attacks in November 2007. He was sentenced to death in December 2008 for attempting to kill Anwar Choudhury in 2004. In March 2012, the son of opposition leader and former prime minister Khaleda Zia, Tarique Rahman, and 28 others were tried in absentia for their alleged involvement in the attack. The supplementary charge sheets charges Huji, influential leaders of the Bangladesh Nationalist Party (BNP) and the Jamaat, including former deputy minister Abdus Salam Pintu, former member of parliament Kazi Shah Mofazzal Hossain Kaikobad and some officials of the Home Ministry, police, DGFI, NSI and PMO with involvement in the planning of the bombing.

Jamal Ahmed, also known as Joj Mia was coerced into giving a false confession. He was forced to implicate Seven-Star Group, led by Subrata Bain through torture by security forces during BNP rule.

Charges and punishments
On 10  October 2018, a special court, Speedy Trial Tribunal-1, delivered verdicts in relevant cases and accused 49 persons in total. It ruled the grenade attack "was a well-orchestrated plan, executed through abuse of state power". Judge Shahed Nuruddin said, "The specialised deadly Arges grenades that are used in wars were blasted at the Awami League's central office on 23 Bangabandhu Avenue in broad daylight with the help of the then state machinery". On charges of killing through common intention, planning and criminal conspiracy, 38 persons were found guilty. 19 of them were sentenced to death:

On the same charges, 19 others were given life term in prison sentences:

All of the 38 were also found guilty of grievously injuring victims through common intention, planning and criminal conspiracy and sentenced to jail for 20 years.

On the charge for harbouring the offenders, former Inspectors General of Police Ashraful Huda and Shahudul Haque were sentenced to two years in jail. For the charges of harbouring and protecting the offenders, Saiful Islam Duke, Saiful Islam Joarder, ATM Amin were given four years in jail. For the charge of misleading the investigation and cooking up the "Joj Mia" story, IGP Khoda Baksh Chowdhury, SP of CID Ruhul Amin, ASPs of CID Abdur Rashid and Munshi Atikur Rahman were sentenced to two years in prison.

Total 18 convicts were on the run at the time of the verdict.

References

External links
 Blasts hit Bangladesh party rally

Mass murder in 2004
Terrorist incidents in Bangladesh in 2004
2000s in Dhaka
History of Bangladesh (1971–present)
Terrorist incidents in Bangladesh
Crime in Dhaka
2004 murders in Bangladesh
Terrorism in Bangladesh